Liolaemus chavin is a species of lizard in the family  Liolaemidae. It is native to Peru.

References

chavin
Reptiles described in 2013
Reptiles of Peru
Taxa named by Jack W. Sites Jr.